Juan Guilherme Nunes Jesus (born 10 June 1991), usually known as Juan Jesus or simply Juan or Juje, is a Brazilian professional footballer who plays as a defender for  club Napoli. He has also represented the Brazil national team.

Club career

Internacional
In 2007, Juan Jesus joined the youth team of Sport Club Internacional. He made his debut on the first team in 2010, winning the 2010 Copa Libertadores, and in December 2011, the club sold him for about R$9.26 million (reported €3.8million fee); 65% of the economic rights of Juan went to his agent, Giuliano Bertolucci and 35% to third-party owner DIS Esporte. The owners of the registration rights of Juan, used a Brazilian club Coimbra Esporte Clube as middleman club.

Internazionale
On 30 January 2012, Juan Jesus joined Serie A club Internazionale. Inter disclosed the fee was €4M, but extra bonus clause was also reported. He made his first Serie A appearance for Inter on 13 May 2012, in the 3–1 away loss against Lazio after coming on as a last-minute substitute for Diego Milito.

During the 2012–13 season, Juan Jesus emerged as part of Inter's first choice starting XI, featuring alongside Andrea Ranocchia and Walter Samuel in a 3–5–2 system. He scored his first goal on 19 May 2013 in a 2–5 home defeat against Udinese, the last match of the domestic season. He ended the year with 44 appearances in all competitions, including 31 in Serie A with Inter, who finished the season in a disappointing ninth place and failed to qualify for either next season's UEFA Champions League or UEFA Europa League.

On 12 July 2013, Juan Jesus took the number 5 shirt after the departure of long-time player Dejan Stanković. In August 2013, he captained Inter for the first time in a friendly match against Real Madrid in the United States, which ended in a 3–0 loss.

On 24 September 2013, Juan Jesus renewed his contract with Inter until 2018 with a reported wage of €1.2 million per year.

Juan Jesus made his 100th appearance for Inter on 4 February 2015 in a game against Napoli in the quarter-finals of the Coppa Italia, which the Nerazzurri lost 1–0 away at Stadio San Paolo thanks to a late winner by Gonzalo Higuaín.

Roma
On 14 July 2016, Juan Jesus joined Roma on loan for €2 million in loan fees and a conditional obligation to purchase for an additional €8 million if certain conditions were met before the end of the loan deal. The purchase obligation was activated during the 2016–17 season, meaning that Jesus would join Roma on a permanent deal in the summer transfer window.

Napoli
On 18 August 2021, Juan Jesus joined Napoli on a season-long deal with an option to extend his contract for the 2022–23 season.

International career
After having played in the under-18 and under-19 national teams, in early 2010, Juan Jesus was selected to the under-20 team by its manager, Ney Franco. In January 2011, he took part in the team's triumph at the 2011 South American U-20 Championship in Peru, playing all eight matches of the competition. In the same year, he participated in the FIFA U-20 World Cup, where Brazil reached the final against Portugal. Juan played the entire match, helping his side to a 3–2 victory after extra time.

Juan Jesus made his Brazilian first team debut against Denmark on 26 May 2012, playing the full 90 minutes in a 1–3 away victory.

Juan Jesus started in the centre of defence, alongside captain Thiago Silva, in all of Brazil's matches at the 2012 London Olympics, helping the nation to a silver medal.

He was an unused substitute as Brazil defeated Argentina 2–0 to win the 2014 Superclásico de las Américas in Beijing.

Since all his caps for Brazil were friendly matches, Juan did not rule out his chance to play for Italy national football team instead. However, it was reported that Juan did not have Italian citizenship (or citizenship of any European Union member), making him ineligible to Italy.

Career statistics

Club

Honours
Internacional
Copa Libertadores: 2010
Campeonato Gaúcho: 2011
Recopa Sudamericana: 2011

Brazil
South American Youth Championship: 2011
FIFA U-20 World Cup: 2011
Olympic Silver Medal: 2012
Superclásico de las Américas: 2014

References

External links

Juan Jesus at WhoScored.com
Juan Jesus – UEFA competitive record
Official profile at sscnapoli.it
 

1991 births
Living people
Association football defenders
Association football fullbacks
Brazilian footballers
Brazilian expatriate footballers
Campeonato Brasileiro Série A players
Serie A players
Sport Club Internacional players
Inter Milan players
A.S. Roma players
S.S.C. Napoli players
Expatriate footballers in Italy
Brazilian expatriate sportspeople in Italy
Brazil international footballers
Footballers at the 2012 Summer Olympics
Olympic footballers of Brazil
Olympic silver medalists for Brazil
Olympic medalists in football
Brazil under-20 international footballers
Brazil youth international footballers
Medalists at the 2012 Summer Olympics
Footballers from Belo Horizonte